Thaxterogaster melleicarneus is a species of fungus in the family Cortinariaceae.

Taxonomy 
It  was described as new to science in 2014 and classified as Cortinarius melleicarneus. It was placed in the subgenus Phlegmacium of the large mushroom genus Cortinarius.

In 2022 the species was transferred from Cortinarius and reclassified as Thaxterogaster melleicarneus based on genomic data.

Etymology 
The specific epithet melleicarneus refers to the honey colored cap.

Habitat and distribution 
Found in Estonia and Norway, where it grows on the ground in association with thermophilous deciduous trees.

See also

List of Cortinarius species

References

External links

melleicarneus
Fungi described in 2014
Fungi of Europe